Janifer is a surname. Notable people with the surname include:

Clarence Sumner Janifer (1886–1950), American physician 
Laurence Janifer (1933–2002), American science fiction author

See also
Jennifer (given name)